The 2021 Chicago Marathon was held on October 10, 2021. It was the 43rd edition of the annual Chicago Marathon, and the first after the start of the COVID-19 pandemic in 2019. The 2020 Chicago Marathon was canceled as a result of the pandemic. The race was the third of five World Marathon Majors scheduled for 2021; all the events in the series took place in the span of six weeks between late September and early November.

Participants were required to provide proof of COVID-19 vaccination or a negative COVID-19 test taken within 72 hours of attending the event.

The marathon was won by Seifu Tura of Ethiopia and Ruth Chepngetich of Kenya, in 2:06:12 and 2:22:31, respectively, while the wheelchair race was won by Daniel Romanchuk and Tatyana McFadden, both of the United States, in 1:29:07 and 1:48:57, respectively.

Results
Results for the top ten in the running races and top three in the wheelchair races are listed below.

References

External links
 

2021
Chicago Marathon
Chicago Marathon
Chicago
Marathon
Marathon
Chicago Marathon